{{Automatic taxobox
|image = Crataegus pennsylvanica fruit.jpg
|image_caption = Crataegus pennsylvanica fruit, series Molles
|taxon = Crataegus sect. Coccineae
|authority = Loudon
}}

Section Coccineae is a section within the genus Crataegus that includes the majority of North American hawthorn diversity. It includes at least 20 series as well as some species that have not yet been assigned to series.

Series
Series in section Coccineae include:
 Aestivales Apricae Bracteatae Coccineae Crus-galli Dilatatae Greggianae Intricatae Lacrimatae Madrenses Molles Parvifoliae Populneae Pruinosae Pulcherrimae Punctatae Rotundifoliae Tenuifoliae Triflorae ViridesTwo more series are sometimes included within section Coccineae:
 Anomalae Macracanthae''

References

Section Coccineae
Flora of North America
Plant sections